The 2007 Victory Road was a professional wrestling pay-per-view (PPV) event produced by Total Nonstop Action Wrestling (TNA), which took place on July 15, 2007, at the Impact Zone in Orlando, Florida. It was the third event under the Victory Road chronology. Eight matches were featured on the event's card.

In October 2017, with the launch of the Global Wrestling Network, the event became available to stream on demand. It would later be available on Impact Plus in May 2019.

Storylines
Victory Road featured ten professional wrestling matches and two pre-show matches that involved different wrestlers from pre-existing scripted feuds and storylines. Wrestlers portrayed villains, heroes, or less distinguishable characters in the scripted events that built tension and culminated in a wrestling match or series of matches.

Results

References

2007 in professional wrestling in Florida
Events in Orlando, Florida
Professional wrestling in Orlando, Florida
Impact Wrestling Victory Road
July 2007 events in the United States
2007 Total Nonstop Action Wrestling pay-per-view events